Bunchosia cauliflora is a species of plant in the family Malpighiaceae. It is endemic to Ecuador.  Its natural habitat is subtropical or tropical moist lowland forests.

References

cauliflora
Endemic flora of Ecuador
Vulnerable plants
Taxonomy articles created by Polbot